Brian Martín Pagés (born 9 April 1996) is a Spanish footballer who plays for Spanish club Gimnástica de Torrelavega. Mainly a forward, he can also play as a winger.

Club career
A CD Tenerife youth graduate, Santa Cruz de Tenerife-born Martín made his senior debut with the reserves on 22 February 2015, coming on as a second-half substitute in a 0–0 Tercera División home draw against UD Telde. He scored his first goal on 11 September, netting the second in a 3–0 home win against UD Cruz Santa.

On 20 January 2017, Martín renewed his contract until 2020. On 18 August, after impressing during the pre-season, he made his professional debut by starting in a 1–0 home win against Real Zaragoza in the Segunda División championship.

On 17 July 2018, Martín was loaned to Segunda División B side UD Melilla, for one year. Upon returning, he was assigned back to the B-team, scoring a career-best 19 goals during the 2019–20 campaign.

On 14 June 2020, Martín moved abroad for the first time in his career, joining Swedish Allsvenskan side Östersunds FK. On 26 September, however, he moved to Apollon Larissa FC of the Super League Greece 2.

References

External links
Tenerife official profile 

1996 births
Living people
Spanish footballers
Spanish expatriate footballers
Footballers from Santa Cruz de Tenerife
Association football forwards
Segunda División players
Segunda División B players
Tercera División players
CD Tenerife B players
CD Tenerife players
UD Melilla footballers
SD Ejea players
Allsvenskan players
Östersunds FK players
Apollon Larissa F.C. players
Gimnástica de Torrelavega footballers
Spanish expatriate sportspeople in Sweden
Spanish expatriate sportspeople in Greece
Expatriate footballers in Sweden
Expatriate footballers in Greece